Tatarhüyük is a village in the District of Balâ, Ankara Province, Turkey.

References

Villages in Balâ District